Bartolomeo Beverini (May3, 1629October24, 1686) was an Italian classical scholar and historian.

Biography 
Beverini was born at Lucca. He is said to have been a finished scholar at fifteen; and at Rome, in his sixteenth year, he joined the Order of the Mother of God, taking vows in 1647. He taught theology in Rome, and later, rhetoric at Lucca. His numerous works are listed by Mazzuchelli. Among them is a vernacular translation of the Æneid, originally the fruit of only thirteen months' application, but subsequently corrected with care. It first appeared at Lucca, in 1680, 12mo, and has been reprinted several times; the last edition is that of Rome, 1700, 4to. The Latin poems of Beverini were published at Lucca in 1674: Carminum libri septem. Beverini's chief claim, however, upon the notice of general scholars, is founded upon a learned posthumous work, first published at Lucca in 1711 8vo, and often reprinted in collections, entitled, Syntagma de Ponderibus et Mensuris, in quo veterum Nummorum Pretium, ac Mensurarum Quantitas demonstratur. This is followed by a treatise on the Comitia of the Romans. Beverini was one of the chief correspondents of Francesco Redi

Works 
  The work was first published anonymously in Lucca in 1666, then in Naples in 1689 by the printer Giacomo Raillard (again anonymously) and finally in Palermo in 1755.
 
 
  This work contains two essays, one on the  weights, measures and coinage of ancient Rome, and the other on the different types of Roman Comitia.

Notes

Sources 
 
 
 
 

Italian classical scholars
17th-century Italian historians
Writers from Lucca

1629 births
1686 deaths